Gopal Jee Thakur (born 15 October 1969) is an Indian Politician from the Bharatiya Janata Party, and a Member of Parliament representing Darbhanga (Lok Sabha constituency) in Bihar, India. He is a Member of Standing Committee on Railways, Member of Consultative Committee, Ministry of Railways, and the special invitee Member of BJP's National Executive committee.

Thakur had represented the Bihar legislative assembly from Benipur (Vidhan Sabha constituency) as a member of the Bharatiya Janata Party in 2010 and served as Vice President of the Bharatiya Janata Party, State Unit of Bihar,India. 

Thakur was elected to 17th Lok Sabha from Darbhanga Lok Sabha seat in the 2019 Indian general election by a margin of 2,67,979 votes. He defeated RJD candidate Abdul Bari Siddiqui.

Early life and education 
Gopal Jee Thakur was born on 15th of October 1969 to a Maithil Brahmin family of Parri village, Biraul, Darbhanga district, Bihar. He was the second of five children born to Ganesh Prasad Thakur (1932-2020) and Ram Sagar Devi. His father late Ganesh Prasad Thakur (Popularly known as Kishan Bhai) was a farmer, a Science teacher and was associated with Jansangh.

He married Chandu Thakur on 5th of July 1999. She is from Nehra village, Manigachhi, Darbhanga District.  

Thakur did his graduation, post graduation and Ph.D in Sociology from Lalit Narayan Mithila University.  He is an agriculturist and a social worker by profession.

Political career 
Thakur is a veteran Politician from Mithila region of Bihar,India and has been associated with BJP for almost four decades. He was very active in student politics of Darbhanga from 1984 to 1990. In 1990, he became the Panchat President of his village Parri. In 1992, he became the President of youth wing of BJP Biraul. In 1994, he became the General Secretary of Kishan Morcha of BJP Darbhanga District. From 1996 to 2003, he served as the President of BJP Biraul for two terms. He became the President of BJP Darbhanga District in 2003. From 2007 to 2013, he served as the member of BJP Bihar State executive committee for two terms. In 2010, he became an MLA From Darbhanga’s Benipur Constituency. In 2017, he became the Vice President of BJP Bihar.

He won the 2019 Indian General Election by securing a total of 5,86,668 votes and elected as the first local MP of Darbhanga Lok Sabha. In 2021, he became the Special Invitee member of Bharatiya Janata Party’s National Executive Committee.

Positions held

Electoral performance

2019

2010

See also 

 2010 Bihar Legislative Assembly election
List of Winners Bihar Assembly Election 2010
List of politicians from Bihar
 List of members of the 17th Lok Sabha

References 

Living people
People from Darbhanga
Bharatiya Janata Party politicians from Bihar
1969 births
Lok Sabha members from Bihar
India MPs 2019–present

External links